Jeeralang Power Station is a gas turbine power station with a capacity of  near Morwell, Victoria, Australia. The station is a peaking facility which is used only during periods of peak demand, and is also used as a black start facility to restore power to the grid in the event of major system failure. As a result, the actual capacity factor of the station is less than 5%. Jeeralang consists of seven gas turbines configured to operate in single cycle mode.

The power station is currently operated by Ecogen Energy and was purchased by EnergyAustralia in April 2018.

References

Natural gas-fired power stations in Victoria (Australia)
Morwell, Victoria